Sint-Joris-Winge is a village in the Belgian municipality of Tielt-Winge, in the province of Flemish Brabant. As of 2003, it had 2,870 inhabitants.

Populated places in Flemish Brabant